Dennis Waring is a historian and ethnomusicologist who was the Connecticut State Troubadour from 2003 through 2004. He wrote a history book on the Estey Organ Company titled Manufacturing the Muse: Estey Organs & Consumer Culture in Victorian America, which was his doctoral dissertation at Weslyan University.

Waring is a local expert on the organs and the role of musical instruments as "primary cultural indicators". He makes improvised instruments from cardboard and other household scraps and teaches other people to do the same.

Publications

 Folk Instruments Make Them & Play Them, It's Easy & It's Fun (1979)
 Making Wood Folk Instruments (1990)
 Great Folk Instruments To Make & Play (1999)
 Cardboard Folk Instruments to Make Play (2000)
 Make Your Own Electric Guitar Bass (2001)
 Manufacturing the Muse: Estey Organs & Consumer Culture in Victorian America (2002)
 Making Drums (2003)

References

External links
 Waring Music - personal site

Ethnomusicologists
Wesleyan University alumni
Year of birth missing (living people)
Living people